Adeline Gousseau (born 24 August 1936) was a French politician who served in the French Senate from 2004 to 2007. She was a member of the Union for a Popular Movement.

Early life 
She was born in Crespières.

Career 
Before entering politics, Gousseau was a farmer in Les Alluets-le-Roi. She was elected in Yvelines on 26 September 2004. Gousseau resigned her seat on 30 September 2007. She also participated in 22 legislative proposals.

Gousseau served as deputy mayor for Les Alluets-le-Roi. She was regional president of a farming co-operative.

References 

1936 births
Living people
French Senators of the Fifth Republic
Women members of the Senate (France)
Union for a Popular Movement politicians
21st-century French women politicians
20th-century French women politicians
Senators of Yvelines